David Lawson Weill (born October 25, 1941, Berkeley, California) is an American former athlete who competed mainly in the discus throw.

Biography
While at Stanford Weill won the 1962 and 1963 NCAA. He competed for the United States in the 1964 Summer Olympics held in Tokyo, Japan in the discus throw where he won the bronze medal, an achievement magnified by the fact that he had only finished third the 1964 US Olympic Trials. He also finished third on three occasions in the US AAU championships. In 1967 he threw his personal best of 62.99m at the Sacramento Invitational Meet, although this was not enough to win the event and he finished third.

References

American male discus throwers
Olympic bronze medalists for the United States in track and field
Athletes (track and field) at the 1964 Summer Olympics
Stanford Cardinal men's track and field athletes
1941 births
Living people
Track and field athletes from California
Medalists at the 1964 Summer Olympics